Twenty Greatest is the sixth album released by British pop group Brotherhood of Man and their first compilation. It was released in 1978 and became their biggest selling album, peaking at No.6 in the UK and being certified gold. 
As the title suggests, it is a collection of twenty songs, including their three number one hits, "Save Your Kisses for Me", "Angelo" and "Figaro" alongside their current single release, "Middle of the Night".

Background
This album was a Greatest Hits compilation featuring all their hit singles up to this point as well as selected album tracks and new recordings. The album was released on K-Tel records (in association with their regular label Pye) in late September 1978 and reached No.6 in the UK album charts. It remained on the charts for 15 weeks and was certified gold by the BPI, becoming the most successful album of their career.

The singles included are: "Lady", "Lady Lady Lay", "Kiss Me Kiss Your Baby", "Save Your Kisses for Me", "My Sweet Rosalie", "Oh Boy (The Mood I'm In)", "Angelo", "Highwayman", "Figaro", "Beautiful Lover" and "Middle of the Night". The early hits "United We Stand" and "Where are You Going to My Love" by the previous incarnation of the group, are included here as new recordings by this version of Brotherhood Of Man. Two other new recordings for this album are cover versions of "How Deep Is Your Love" and "Send in the Clowns", which is largely an a cappella piece, with piano accompaniment by member Nicky Stevens. Magazine Record Mirror called current single "Middle of the Night" "positively dreadful".

This album is sometimes referred to simply as Brotherhood of Man - as this was the name (erroneously) accredited to it in the UK Chart listings. Early pressings of the album gave the group's name as The'' Brotherhood of Man' (a name they hadn't been known as since the first incarnation of the group in the early 1970s) (see illustration), but later pressings had rectified this to simply 'Brotherhood of Man'.

The Soviet record company Melodiya released this album in 1981 as a 12-track collection: Side A: "Save Your Kisses for Me", "Angelo", "Oh Boy (The Mood I'm In)", "My Sweet Rosalie", "Kiss Me Kiss Your Baby", "Beautiful Lover"; Side B: "Middle of the Night" , "Figaro", "Highwayman" , "He Ain't Heavy, He's My Brother", "Lady Lady Lady Lay", "United We Stand". This compilation was very popular in the USSR and sold 500,000 copies.

Track listingSide One "Save Your Kisses for Me" (Tony Hiller, Lee Sheriden, Martin Lee) – 3:04
 "Angelo" (Hiller, Sheriden, Lee) – 3:18
 "Oh Boy (The Mood I'm In)" (Tony Romeo) – 3:16
 "Where are You Going to My Love" (Hiller, Goodison, Day) – 3:24
 "Images" (Hiller, Sheriden, Lee) – 2:25
 "Send in the Clowns" (Stephen Sondheim) – 3:50
 "In Love" (Hiller, Sheriden, Lee) – 3:53
 "My Sweet Rosalie" (Hiller, Sheriden, Lee) – 2:37
 "Kiss Me Kiss Your Baby" (Barry Blue) – 3:05
 "Beautiful Lover" (Hiller, Sheriden, Lee) – 3:21Side Two'''
 "Middle of the Night" (Hiller, Sheriden, Lee) – 3:05
 "Figaro" (Hiller, Sheriden, Lee) – 2:51
 "Highwayman" (Hiller, Sheriden, Lee) – 2:32
 "People Over the World" (Hiller, Sheriden, Lee) – 3:05
 "He Ain't Heavy, He's My Brother" (Bob Russell, Bobby Scott) – 4:23
 "To-night's the Night" (Hiller, Sheriden, Lee) – 2:40
 "Lady Lady Lady Lay" (Hiller, Groscolas, Jordan) – 2:58 
 "How Deep Is Your Love" (Barry Gibb, Maurice Gibb, Robin Gibb) – 4:08
 "Lady" (Hiller, Sheriden, Lee) – 3:27
 "United We Stand" (Hiller, Simons) – 2:57

Personnel 
 Martin Lee - vocals
 Lee Sheriden - vocals
 Nicky Stevens - vocals, piano on "Send in the Clowns"
 Sandra Stevens - vocals
 Tony Hiller - producer
 Lee Sheriden - arranger (tracks 1,2,3,5,7,8,10,11,12,13,16,18)
 Colin Frechter - arranger (tracks 6,14,15,17,19)
 Cy Payne - arranger (tracks 4,20)
 Graham Prescott - arranger (track 9)
John Constable Design Company - Sleeve design

Chart performance

References

Brotherhood of Man albums
1978 greatest hits albums
Albums produced by Tony Hiller